Przewięź Lock - the sixth lock on the Augustów Canal (from the Biebrza River). Located in the village Przewięź, Poland between the lakes Lake Studzieniczne and Lake Białe Augustowskie was built in the 1826–1827 by Lt.-Col. Eng. August Szulc. To this day, preserved in their original condition.
 Location: 43.6 km channel
 Level difference: 0.86 m
 Length: 46.17 m
 Width: 5.96 m
 Gates: Wooden
 Year built: 1826–1827
 Construction Manager: Lt.-Col. Eng. August Szulc

References

 
 
 

19th-century establishments in Poland
Przewięź